Ray's Moods is a studio album by Ray Charles released in July 1966.

Track listing
 "What-Cha Doing In There (I Wanna Know)" (C. Sessions) – 2:22
 "Please Say You're Fooling" (Bobby Stevenson) – 2:43
 "By the Light of the Silvery Moon" (Edward Madden, Gus Edwards) – 2:46
 "You Don't Understand" (Biba Lee Walker) – 3:05
 "Maybe It's Because of Love" (Percy Mayfield) – 3:08
 "Chitlins with Candied Yams" (Ray Charles) – 4:40
 "Granny Wasn't Grinning That Day" (Percy Mayfield) – 2:08
 "She's Lonesome Again" (George Riddle) – 2:29
 "Sentimental Journey" (Ben Homer, Bud Green, Les Brown) – 2:56
 "A Born Loser" (Don Gibson) – 2:13
 "It's a Man's World" (Leroy Kirkland, Pearl Woods) – 3:23
 "A Girl I Used To Know" (Jack Clement) – 2:39

Charting history

Personnel
Ray Charles – Keyboards, Vocals
Onzy Matthews - arranger

External links
 

Ray Charles albums
1966 albums
ABC Records albums
Tangerine Records (1962) albums